Juan Carlos Méndez Guédez (born March 2, 1967 in Barquisimeto, Venezuela) is a Venezuelan write. From an early age, he and his family moved to Caracas, where he lived in the popular area of Los Jardines del Valle, but always kept a close connection with his native hometown. He earned a Bachelor of Arts from the Central University of Venezuela with a thesis on poetry groups "Traffic" and "Guaire". Later he earned a Ph.D. in Hispanic American Literature from the University of Salamanca with a thesis on the Venezuelan writer José Balza.

He has published fifteen books including novels, volumes of short stories and essays. He lives in Spain, country where he has written and published most of his work. His work has been part of several anthologies in Spanish as Líneas aéreas and Pequeñas resistencias and some of his stories have been published in Switzerland, France, Bulgaria, Italy, Slovenia and the United States.

In Venezuela, his texts are part of two recent short story anthologies: Las voces secretas, published by Alfaguara, and 21 del XXI, that was commercially released by Ediciones B.

He has been invited to several important international literary events such as the International Guadalajara Book Fair, the Fair of Santiago de Chile, the Madrid eñe Festival, and has lectured at universities and institutions in Algeria, Colombia, Croatia, Spain, France, Switzerland, Venezuela, etc.

In April 2013 his novel Arena Negra was awarded Book of the Year by booksellers in Venezuela.

Work 
Topics such as the uprooting of exiles, travel, love, sentimentality, are part of the narrative interests of Méndez Guédez, a work characterized by multiple records that are moved from the use of orality, to the development of sound prose, embedded with a deep lyricism.

Méndez Guédez's work has been placed by many literary scholars — such as Chiara Bolognese (Autonomous University of Madrid), Fabiola Fernandez (Andrés Bello Catholic University), Vega Sánchez (University of Salamanca), or Maartje Vranken (Katholieke Universiteit Leuven) — in the orbit of the Spanish-American romantic and sentimental narrative. A line of writing that comes from authors like Manuel Puig or Alfredo Bryce Echenique, in which the humor, relationships with popular culture, and the emphasis on the emotional dramas of male characterized by their fragility, define the general discourse of its narrative. But, as the writer Ignacio Sanz argues, in Méndez Guédez one sees a sense of dual belonging, on one side to the Peninsular Spanish cultural register and, on the other, to the Hispanic American worldview, which is evident in the construction of his prose style, full of winks and lexical features that constitute a sort of mestizo language in itself.

This circumstance of intense attachment to two countries — two realities — places Méndez Guédez in a particular creative line of 21st-century Spanish language fiction that also involves authors such as Fernando Iwasaki, Jorge Eduardo Benavides, Juan Gabriel Vasquez, Andrés Neuman, etc.; writers whose fictions embodies a nostalgic look at the place of origin, combined with a critical outlook of the place of residence, all which confers their narratives with an expressive mixture of universal character.

As stated by critic Marco Kunz (University of Lausanne): "The migrant narrative of Méndez Guédez demonstrates the possibility of a new Latin American literature that is not enclosed in the obliguismo that explores the hallmarks of local, regional or national, nor chooses a staunch internationalism ".

Notably, Méndez Guédez is one of the authors who started fictionalizing the immigration of 21st-century Spain with his novel  Una tarde con campanas, published in 2004. A topic that has been followed up by authors such as Joseph Shepherd, Carmen Jiménez, Pablo Aranda, Donato Ndongo, Najat El Hachmi, James Roncagliolo and Angels Case, among others.

In a way, his books incorporate into its narrative a sense of both the spatial and cultural diversity that is characteristic of his country, together with that of the Iberian Peninsula and the Canary Islands, as to conform a larger and richer fictional universe. This element, according to German critic Burkhard Pohl, constitutes a feature of a certain segment of the current Latin American narrative, in which the style of authors such as Méndez Guédez and Jorge Volpi serve as a parody of the exchange between different realities, highlighting the absurd literary notion that attached preconceived worldviews to certain writers from different regions of the planet.

Méndez Guédez is considered by many a renovator of the romantic tradition in Latin American narrative. Some of Méndez Guédez's works also have stylistic features that go back to the English comic novel — such as certain strain of vulgar eroticism — but that nonetheless remain within the influence of more contemporary and experimental trends in story construction — all that is without forgetting the passion for the power of anecdote and the seduction of the reader, and exploring expressive tools that break with classical linearity. Thus, each of Méndez Guédez texts can be a literary universe in itself; one that answers common themes but that is also able to expose a diverse scriptural development.

Bibliography 
La diosa del agua: Cuentos y mitos del Amazonas (Páginas de espuma, Madrid, 2020)
La ola detenida (Harper Collins, Madrid 2017)
El baile de madame Kalalú (Siruela, Madrid, 2016)
Los maletines (Siruela, Madrid 2014)
Arena negra (Lugar Común, Caracas, 2012, Casadcartón, Madrid, 2013, Casadcartón, Lima 2013)
Ideogramas (Páginas de espuma, Madrid, 2012)
Chulapos Mambo (Casadcartón, Madrid, 2011; Lugar Común, Caracas, 2012)
Tal vez la lluvia (DVD, Barcelona, 2009; Ebook: https://web.archive.org/web/20070716063515/http://www.leer-e.es/
La bicicleta de Bruno (Ediciones B, Caracas, 2009)
Hasta luego, Míster Salinger (Páginas de espuma, Madrid, 2007)
El barco en que viajas (UNEY, San Felipe, 2007)
Nueve mil kilómetros y tu abrazo (Ediciones B, Bogotá, 2006)
Una tarde con campanas (Alianza, Madrid, 2004; Equinoccio, Caracas, 2012)
Tan nítido en el recuerdo (Lengua de trapo, Madrid, 2001)
Árbol de luna (Lengua de trapo, Madrid, 2000)
La ciudad de arena (Calembé, Cádiz, 2000)
Palabras de agosto (Mucuglifo, Mérida, Venezuela, 1999)
El libro de Esther (Lengua de trapo, Madrid, 1999;  Lugar común, Caracas, 2011); Ebook: https://web.archive.org/web/20070716063515/http://www.leer-e.es/
Retrato de Abel con isla volcánica al fondo (Troya, Caracas, 1997); Ebook: http://www.musaalas9.com
La Resurrección de Scheerezade (Solar, Mérida, Venezuela, 1994)
Historias del edificio (Guaraira Repano, Caracas, 1994)

IN FRENCH:

Mambo canaille (Zinnia Éditions, Lyon, 2014) French translation by Nicole Rochaix-Salmona
La pluie peut-être (Orbis Tertius, Dijon, 2014) French translation by Adelaide De Chatellus
La ville de Sable (Albatros, Geneve, 2011) French translation by Adelaide De Chatellus

Anthologies and other publications 

Crude Words: Contemporary Writing from Venezuela. Compiled by Tim Girven, Montague Kobbe and Katie Brown (Ragpicker Press, 2016)
La heteronimia poética y sus variaciones transatlánticas. Compiled by Mario Barrero Fajardo. (Universidad de los Andes, Bogotá, 2013)
Novísima relación. Narrativa amerispánica actual. Edited and collected by Daniel Mesa Gancedo. (Institución Fernando el Católico, Zaragoza, 2012)
Náufragos en San Borondón (Baile del sol, Tenerife, 2012)
Los oficios del libro. Foreword by Juan Villoro. (Libros de la Ballena, Madrid, 2011)
Les bonnes nouvelles de l´amerique latine. Foreword by Mario Vargas Llosa. Selection by Fernando Iwasaki and Gustavo Guerrero (Gallimard, París, 2010)
La Vasta Brevedad. Selection by Antonio López Ortega, Carlos Pacheco and Miguel Gomes (Alfaguara, Caracas, 2010)
Narrativa latinoamericana para el siglo XXI: nuevos enfoques y territorios. Edited by Ángel Esteban; Jesús Montoya, Francisca Noguerol and María Ángeles Pérez López (OLMS, Hildesheim, 2010)
"Les pruniers fleurissent en mars" in Rue Saint Ambroise, #24 (París, 2009)
Atmósferas. (Asociación cultural Mucho Cuento, Córdoba, 2009)
El lugar donde ocurren las historias. Conferencia. Preliminary study by Chiara Bolognese (Centre de Recherches Latino-Americaines, Poitiers, 2009)
'"El cuento hispanoamericano contemporáneo; Vivir del cuento" in Rilma 2, ADEHL, México /París, 2009)
Zgodbe Iz Venezuele (Sodobnost Internacional, Ljubljana, 2009)
"Cinquième étage à droite" in Rue Saint Ambroise, #21 (París, 2008)
21 del XXI. Antólogo: Rubi Guerra (Ediciones B, Caracas, 2007)
Inmenso estrecho (Kailas, Madrid, 2007)
"Histoire d´amour à Santiago de León Caracas ou la minijupe couleur miel" in La nouvelle Revue Française, #581 (París, Gallimard, 2007)
 Que me cuentas (antología de cuentos y gúia de lectura para jóvenes, padres y profesores). Edited by Amalia Vilches  (Páginas de espuma, Madrid, 2006)
"Nueva cuentística venezolana: breve inmersión" in Hispamérica, #97 (Maryland, University of Maryland, 2004)
Pequeñas resistencias. Selección de Andrés Neuman (Páginas de espuma, Madrid, 2002)
Líneas aéreas (Lengua de trapo, Madrid, 1999)
Un paseo por la narrativa venezolana (Resma, Santa Cruz de Tenerife, 1998)
Narrativa venezolana Attuale (Bulzoni Editore, Roma, 1995)

References

External links 
Interview: New Novel by Juan Carlos Méndez Guédez Narrates the Violence and Corruption of Chavista Venezuela : http://venepoetics.blogspot.com.es/2014/07/new-novel-by-juan-carlos-mendez-guedez.html
Interview: “Books represent everything the government isn’t” 
Juan Carlos Méndez Guédez in Conocer al autor
La Mancha
Interview in Relectura
Juan Carlos Méndez Guédez in Centro Virtual Cervantes
"Historia de amor en Santiago de León de Caracas, o la minifalda color miel"
Edmundo Paz Soldán talks about Hasta luego, míster Salinger in El Boomeran
Vicente Luis Mora reseña Hasta luego, míster Salinger
"Méndez Guédez: apuntes sobre la lectura"
"Una tarde con campanas" (vídeo) 
[más o menos 40 (escritores en Madrid)] http://www.elmundo.es/elmundo/2009/04/14/cultura/1239711105.html
Dossier dedicated to Méndez Guédez in Otro Lunes 

Venezuelan novelists
Venezuelan male writers
Male novelists
People from Caracas
1967 births
Living people
University of Salamanca alumni